Svingvoll is a village in Gausdal Municipality in Innlandet county, Norway.

References

Gausdal
Villages in Innlandet